Lafourcade is a surname. Bearers include:
Members of the French noble family Forcade
Natalia Lafourcade (born 1984), Mexican singer and songwriter, niece of Enrique
Michel Lafourcade (1941–2006), French firefighter commander
Jérôme Lafourcade (born 1983), French footballer 
Enrique Lafourcade (1927–2019), Chilean writer and journalist, uncle of Natalia
Émile Lafourcade-Cortina (1864–1904), French fencer

See also
Fourcade, a related surname

Surnames of French origin